In model railroading, a layout is a diorama containing scale track for operating trains.  The size of a layout varies, from small shelf-top designs to ones that fill entire rooms, basements, or whole buildings.

Attention to modeling details such as structures and scenery is common. Simple layouts are generally situated on a table, although other methods are used, including doors. More permanent construction methods involve attaching benchwork framing to the walls of the room or building in which the layout is situated.

Track layout

An important aspect of any model railway is the layout of the track itself. Apart from the stations, there are four basic ways of arranging the track, and innumerable variations:
 Continuous loop. A circle or oval, with trains going round and round.  Used in train sets.
 Point to point. A line with a station at each end, with trains going from one station to the other.
 Out and back. A pear shaped track, with trains leaving a station, going round a reversing loop, and coming back to the same station.
 Shunting (US: Switching). Either a station, a motive power depot or a yard where the primary mode of operation is shunting.  This includes layouts which are built as a train shunting puzzle such as Timesaver and Inglenook Sidings

Common variations:
 On a point to point layout, the train can increase the time it takes to get from A to B by going around a continuous loop a few times.
 Single or double track or more, so more trains can run at the same time.
 Intermediate stations, to distinguish between express trains which go straight through and local trains which stop briefly.
 Branch lines, to add an excuse for more stations and different types of trains.
 Use of multiple levels.
 Arranging the continuous loop as a figure-of-8, possibly with one track going over the other instead of having tracks crossing on the same level.
 Folding one loop of a figure-of-8 over the other loop to produce a looped-8, so as to reduce the amount of space needed while keeping a long continuous run.
 Using one or more fiddle yards (US: staging tracks) to represent the rest of the railway system. A fiddle yard is regarded as off-scene; it may hold multiple complete trains, and may also be subject to direct human intervention (fiddling) to re-arrange trains,
 Dog-bone arrangement of a continuous loop; the sides of an oval are squeezed together so it looks like a double-track section with a loop at each end where the trains turn around.
 Rabbit warren; a continuous loop folded over itself several times with multiple levels and many tunnels for trains to pop in and out of - often a small layout with sharp curves and short trains.

Station layout

There are three basic types of station, and sometimes combinations of these types:
 Terminus or terminal station. As the name implies, all trains stop here, and then go back to where they came from.
 Through station. Trains can go through this station; express trains don't stop, while local trains do stop briefly before continuing their journey.
 Junction. The tracks diverge/join here.

Other factors which affect the track layout of a station include:
 For passengers only, or for goods only, or for both passengers and goods.
 Use of steam engines and/or diesel/electric engines.
 Use of trains which can be driven from either end, e.g. Diesel Multiple Units.

The simplest possible station for passengers consists of just a platform beside the track, with no points (US: switches) or sidings. Both terminal and through stations can be as simple as this; a junction requires at least one point.

References
 "Adventurous Model Railway Plans."  A. Postlethwaite. . Basic configurations, page 9.
 "Basic Model Railroading: Getting Started in the Hobby." Kent J Johnson. , Kalmbach Publishing, 1998.
 "Railway Modeling." N Simmons, 8th edition, . Planning the layout Chapter 5.
 "Track Plans", C. J. Freezer. Peco Publications, 2nd edition.
 Layout Design Special Interest Group see subpage: Design Primer/Introduction to the wide variety of layouts possible

External links
 http://www.plasticoferroviario.it – Hints and tips for model railroaders
 http://modeltrains.about.com – Online resource for model railroaders
 http://www.gatewaynmra.org/project.htm – Small model railroad project layouts
 http://carendt.com/ – Micro/Small Layouts for Model Railroads showing hundreds of examples

Rail transport modelling